Mount Holly is the name of the following places in the United States:

 Mount Holly, Arkansas, an unincorporated community
 Mount Holly Cemetery, Little Rock, Arkansas, listed on the National Register of Historic Places (NRHP) in Arkansas
 Mount Holly, Baltimore, Maryland, a neighborhood of Baltimore
 Mount Holly Ski Area, Holly, Michigan
 Mount Holly Cemetery, Mount Holly, New Jersey
 Mount Holly Mausoleum, Little Rock, Arkansas, listed on the NRHP in Arkansas
 Mount Holly (Foote, Mississippi), a plantation on the NRHP in Mississippi
 Mount Holly, New Jersey, a township
 Mount Holly Historic District, Mount Holly, New Jersey, listed on the NRHP in New Jersey
 Mount Holly (New York), an elevation
 Mount Holly, North Carolina, a city 
 Mount Holly Cotton Mill, Mount Holly, North Carolina, on the NRHP in North Carolina
 Mount Holly, Clermont County, Ohio, an unincorporated community
 Mount Holly, Warren County, Ohio, an unincorporated community
 Mount Holly, South Carolina, an unincorporated community
 Mount Holly, Vermont, a town
 Mount Holly, Virginia, an unincorporated community

See also
Holly (disambiguation)